"Wot's It to Ya" is the third single by American musician Robbie Nevil from his self-titled debut album, released as a single in May 1987 by Manhattan Records. It peaked at number 10 on the US Billboard Hot 100.

Lyrics and writing 
The song is about an ex who jilted the singer and then wants to know how he's been, to which the reply is "wot's it to ya". At the end of recording the album, Nevil thought had finished, having cut all the songs. He said that producer Alex Sadkin said "You know what? We still don't have it." I'd be like, "We still don't have what?" And he goes, "We still don't have the first single." Sadkin told Nevil "Always come from the school of you don't have your first single, and always try to the bitter end to come up with something even better." Therefore, "Wot's It to Ya"  was written, even though in the end it wasn't released as the first single. The song features a harmonica solo by Judd Lander.

Track listing 
7"

 "Wot's It to Ya" – 3:41
 "Wot's It to Ya" (To Ya Remix) – 4:05

12" (US & Canada only)

 "Wot's It to Ya" (Rusty's 12" Dance Mix) – 9:57
 "Wot's It to Ya" (Rusty's Vocal Dub Mix) – 6:50
 "Wot's It to Ya" (Rusty's Vocoder Dub) – 6:55
 "Wot's It to Ya" (Extended To Ya Remix) – 5:09
 "Wot's It to Ya" (To Ya Remix) – 4:05

12" (Europe only)

 "Wot's It to Ya" (Rusty's 12" Dance Remix) – 9:57
 "Wot's It to Ya" (Dub To Ya Mix) – 6:28
 "Wot's It to Ya" (To Ya Remix) – 4:04

12" (Europe & Australasia only)

 "Wot's It to Ya" (Extended To Ya Remix) – 5:09
 "Wot's It to Ya" (Dub To Ya Mix) – 6:28
 "Wot's It to Ya" (To Ya Remix) – 4:04

Cassette (UK only)

 "Wot's It To Ya" (Extended To Ya Remix) – 5:09
 "C'est la Vie" (The Steve Street Mix) – 5:11
 "Dominoes" (Extended Vocal Mix) – 6:05
 "Wot's It To Ya" (Extended To Ya Remix) – 5:09
 "C'est la Vie" (The Steve Street Mix) – 5:11
 "Dominoes" (Extended Vocal Mix) – 6:05

Charts

References 

1987 singles
1986 songs
Robbie Nevil songs
Manhattan Records singles
Songs written by Robbie Nevil
Song recordings produced by Alex Sadkin